Apne Apne ( Our Own) is a 1987 Hindi-language drama film, produced and directed by Ramesh Behl under the Rose Movies banner. It stars Jeetendra, Rekha and Hema Malini in a special appearance with music composed by R. D. Burman. The film is recorded as a flop at the box office.

Plot
Ravi Kapoor (Jeetendra) is a multimillionaire, who lives with his mother (Sushma Seth) and runs a construction business, his mother wants to make his marriage with a foreign returned girl Seema (Hema Malini), who also comes from another wealthy family. But Ravi is already in love with a poor orphan girl Sharda (Rekha). Ravi introduces her to his mother, but she instantly disapproves of her, so Ravi doesn't have any other choice except to leave the house and marry Sharda. After some time, Sharda becomes pregnant, Ravi's mother also relents and changes her mind and welcomes them back to home. But things get changed when Sharda meets with an accident, has a miscarriage and is told that she will never be able to conceive again. So she decides to get rid of her from Ravi's life, because he is fond of children. After Sharda has disappeared, Ravi's mother forces him to marry Seema, finally he agrees and remarries her and soon she gives birth to a boy named Vijay.

Years later Vijay (Karan Shah) grows up as spoiled child acquiring a lot of bad habits such as alcohol, womanizing etc. One day Ravi meets Sharda accidentally who is running an Ashram named Shanti Dham. Once in physical altercations, Vijay makes revelry with the underworld powerful Don Samrat (Kader Khan) and he wants to kill him. To protect Vijay, Ravi hides him in Shanti Dham Ashram, there with Sharda's association, Vijay completely changes his lifestyle, leaves all his bad habits and also falls in love with a beautiful girl Ila (Mandakini), who was brought up by Sharda. Seema, told about it, she gets enraged at Ravi, especially knowing that Sharda is still alive. She reaches Shanti Dham Ashram to get her son back, at the same time Samrat attacks  them, finally, Sharda sacrifices her life to protect Vijay by uniting Ravi with his family.

Cast
Jeetendra as Ravi Kapoor 
Rekha as Sharda Kapoor
Hema Malini as Seema Kapoor (Special appearance)
Karan Shah as Vijay Kapoor
Mandakini as Ila
Satish Shah as Dheeraj
Kader Khan as Samrat 
Sushma Seth as Mrs. Kapoor  
Beena Banerjee as Tara
Dan Dhanoa as Sudhir

Soundtrack

References

Films scored by R. D. Burman
1980s Hindi-language films
Rose Audio Visuals
Films directed by Ramesh Behl